Fantoni is an Italian surname.  It may refer to:
 Angelo Fantoni, Italian priest and exorcist
 Barry Fantoni, English writer
 Cesare Fantoni, Italian actor
 Fulvio Fantoni (born 1963), Italian bridge player
 Giovanni Fantoni, Italian poet
 Ludovico Fantoni, Polish diplomat
 Sergio Fantoni, Italian actor
 Stefano Fantoni, 2001 Kalinga Prize winner